French Sikhs are a minority group in France. Numbering about 8000, most Sikhs are based in Bobigny and the rest of Île-de-France. There is a gurudwara in Bobigny and another Le Bourget.

Turban ban
French Sikhs have been in the limelight since the 2004 turban ban, banning Sikhs and other religions from sporting a headwear. This has met with anger and worldwide protest by the Sikhs. At least five Sikhs wearing turbans or cloth covers for their uncut hair were barred from classrooms near Paris. For three years, Sikhs petitioned the authorities to lift the ban on the turban.

Gurdwaras
Gurdwaras in France include:
Gurudwara Singh Sabha Culte Sikh France, Bobigny
Gurdwara Sahib, Bourget
Gurudwara Guru Teg Bahadur Sahib, Bondy
Gurdwara Sant Baba Prem Singh Ji, La Courneuve
Gurdwara Shri Guru Ravidass, Paris

Association
Singh Sabha Paris
Conseil Representatif des Sikhs de France
 Sikhs de France
 Sikh Council France
 Sikhs Unis
 Punjab Sports Club
 Chardikala Sewak Jatha France
 Nawjawan Sikh France
 International Sikh Charity France
 International Sikh Council France

Places with a significant Sikh population
Bobigny
Seine-Saint-Denis

References

External links

Religion in France
France
Fra